Antuna or Antuña is a Spanish surname. Notable people with this name include the following:

Abelardo Fernández Antuña (born 1970), also known simply as Abelardo, Spanish footballer
Bladimir Antuna or José Bladimir Antuna Vázquez García (1970 – 2009), Mexican journalist
Fidel Antuña Batista (born 1972), Mexican politician
Graciano Antuña (1903 – 1937), Spanish politician
Pablo Fernández Antuña (born 1979), known as Blin, Spanish footballer
Raquel Peña de Antuña (born Raquel Peña Rodríguez; 1966), Dominican politician
Raúl Antuña (born 1973), Argentine footballer
Uriel Antuna or Carlos Uriel Antuna Romero (born 1997), Mexican footballer

See also

Estadio Hermanos Antuña
Antona (name)
Antun

Spanish-language surnames